Offrande Jolynold Serge  Zanzala (born 13 December 1997) is a Congolese professional footballer who plays as a forward for League Two club Newport County.

Career
Zanzala emigrated with his family from the Republic of the Congo to Austria in 1999 due to the Second Republic of the Congo Civil War.

Derby County
Aged eight, he moved with his family to England, and, aged 12, signed with the Derby County Academy. He was named as the Under-21 Premier League Player of the Month in October 2015 after scoring four goals in three youth team matches. On 23 January 2016, he joined League Two side Stevenage on a one-month loan. He made his debut in the Football League later that day, playing the first 67 minutes of a draw with Barnet at Broadhall Way. In February 2017, Zanzala signed a contract extension keeping him with the Rams until 2019.

Zanzala joined National League club Chester on loan in October 2017. He returned to Derby the following month after the expiry of his loan. In January 2018 he was loaned out again, to Accrington Stanley in League Two. He scored his first professional goal on 21 April 2018, an injury-time penalty after he had been fouled, in a 0-4 win at Wycombe Wanderers.

Accrington Stanley
On 2 August 2018, Zanzala rejoined Accrington, this time on a permanent deal, signing a two-year contract for an undisclosed fee. On 24 June 2020 it was announced Zanzala was leaving Accrington Stanley, having scored eight goals in his second season at the club.

Crewe Alexandra
On 1 July 2020, Crewe Alexandra announced Zanzala had joined the club on a one-year deal with the option of a second year. He made his Crewe debut in a 3-2 victory at Bolton Wanderers in an EFL Trophy group game on 8 September 2020. He scored his only goal for Crewe on 10 November 2020 in an EFL Trophy group game against Shrewsbury Town. On 2 January 2021 it was confirmed that Zanzala had been released by Crewe by mutual consent.

Carlisle United
On 8 January 2021 he signed for Carlisle United. At the end of the season, Zanzala was offered a new contract with the club.

Barrow
On 7 June 2021, Zanzala joined Barrow on a two-year contract. On 10 January 2022, Zanzala joined EFL League Two side Exeter City on loan for the remainder of the 2021–22 season. Zanzala was part of the Exeter team that achieved promotion as League Two runners-up.

On 11 June 2022, Zanzala had his contract terminated by mutual consent.

Newport County
On 21 June 2022, Zanzala joined Newport County on a one year contract. He made his debut for Newport on 30 July 2022 in the starting line up for the 1-1 League Two draw against Sutton United. After just two League Two matches Zanzala suffered a serious injury which ruled him out until December 2022.
He scored his first goal for Newport on 2 December 2022 on his return to the team as a second half substitute in the 2-1 League Two win against Crewe Alexandra.

Personal life
Zanzala has three brothers. He is a devout Christian who prays before every game. He went to school with Kwame Thomas and the two are still good friends, as they both began their pro careers with Derby.

Career statistics

Honours
Exeter City
League Two runner-up: 2021–22

References

External links

1997 births
Living people
Sportspeople from Brazzaville
Republic of the Congo footballers
Association football forwards
Republic of the Congo emigrants to Austria
Republic of the Congo expatriate footballers
Republic of the Congo expatriate sportspeople in England
Expatriate footballers in England
Derby County F.C. players
Stevenage F.C. players
Chester F.C. players
Accrington Stanley F.C. players
Crewe Alexandra F.C. players
Carlisle United F.C. players
Barrow A.F.C. players
Exeter City F.C. players
Newport County A.F.C. players
English Football League players
Republic of the Congo Christians
National League (English football) players